The 1885 North-West Territories election was the first major election in the history of the territory. On 15 September 1885, 11 members were elected in separate elections or by acclamation. The elections saw members acclaimed and elected in various electoral districts to the 1st Council of the North-West Territories.

The elections were held to elect members to new districts, created to cope with rapid growth of settlers in the NWT at the time. These new districts were drawn in the wake of the North-West Rebellion of spring, 1885. 

Elections were also held in established electoral districts to renew members terms at the end of 3 years as per North-West Territories law at the time. 

The election was not considered a general election, since it did not involve every electoral district, and was not caused by the dissolution of the council. 

The election was followed by the 1st North-West Territories general election three years later, in 1888 at the completion of the members' 3-year terms. The election was conducted without political parties.

Qu'Appelle and Regina each elected two members. In these districts, the election was held using Block Voting --  each voter could cast up to two votes.

Summary

Members elected

Calgary and Moose Mountain did not participate in the 1885 election having elected members to a three-year term in 1884. 
Moosomin and St. Albert electoral districts were won by acclamation.

References

External links
Elections NWT

1885 elections in Canada
1885 in the Northwest Territories
Elections in the Northwest Territories
September 1885 events